Kolkhozashen or Arpaduzu is a village de facto in the Martuni Province of the breakaway Republic of Artsakh, de jure in the Khojavend District of Azerbaijan, in the disputed region of Nagorno-Karabakh.

History 
During the Soviet period, the village was a part of the Martuni District of the Nagorno-Karabakh Autonomous Oblast.

Historical heritage sites 
Historical heritage sites in and around the village include khachkars from between the 15th and 17th centuries, a 17th/18th-century village, an 18th/19th-century cemetery, and the 19th-century church of Surb Astvatsatsin.

Economy and culture 
The population is mainly engaged in agriculture and animal husbandry. As of 2015, the village has a municipal building, a house of culture, a secondary school, and a medical centre.

Demographics 
The village has an ethnic Armenian-majority population, had 309 inhabitants in 2005, and 241 inhabitants in 2015.

References

External links 
 
 

Populated places in Martuni Province
Populated places in Khojavend District